Bobbie Baker is amongst the long list of comedians who appeared on The Ed Sullivan Show. There were two appearances in 1962.

References

External links 

 

American women comedians
Living people
Year of birth missing (living people)
21st-century American women